Affliction is a 1996 American documentary film directed by Mark Hejnar and starring GG Allin, Mike Diana, Full Force Frank, Annie Sprinkle.

Cast
 GG Allin
 Mike Diana
 Full Force Frank
 Annie Sprinkle

References

External links
 

1990s English-language films
1996 films
American documentary films
1996 documentary films
1990s American films